The elimination phase of the 2014 Copa Sudamericana was played from August 19 to September 24, 2014. A total of 46 teams competed in the elimination phase.

Draw
The draw of the tournament was held on May 20, 2014, 12:00 UTC−3, at the Sheraton Hotel in Buenos Aires, Argentina.

Excluding the defending champion (entering in the round of 16), the other 46 teams were divided into four zones:
South Zone: Teams from Bolivia, Chile, Paraguay, and Uruguay (entering in the first stage)
North Zone: Teams from Colombia, Ecuador, Peru, and Venezuela (entering in the first stage)
Argentina Zone: Teams from Argentina (entering in the second stage)
Brazil Zone: Teams from Brazil (entering in the second stage)

The draw mechanism was as follows:
South Zone and North Zone:
For the first stage, the 16 teams from the South Zone were drawn into eight ties, and the 16 teams from the North Zone were drawn into the other eight ties. Teams which qualified for berths 1 were drawn against teams which qualified for berths 4, and teams which qualified for berths 2 were drawn against teams which qualified for berths 3, with the former hosting the second leg in both cases. Teams from the same association could not be drawn into the same tie.
For the second stage, the 16 winners of the first stage were drawn into eight ties. The eight winners from the South Zone were drawn against the eight winners from the North Zone, with the former hosting the second leg in four ties, and the latter hosting the second leg in the other four ties.
Argentina Zone: The six teams were drawn into three ties. Teams which qualified for berths 1–3 were drawn against teams which qualified for berths 4–6, with the former hosting the second leg.
Brazil Zone: The eight teams were split into four ties. No draw was held, where the matchups were based on the berths which the teams qualified for: 1 vs. 8, 2 vs. 7, 3 vs. 6, 4 vs. 5, with the former hosting the second leg.

Seeding
The following was the seeding of the 46 teams entered into the first stage and second stage draw:

Format
In the elimination phase, each tie was played on a home-and-away two-legged basis. If tied on aggregate, the away goals rule was used. If still tied, the penalty shoot-out was used to determine the winner (no extra time was played). The 15 winners of the second stage (three from Argentina Zone, four from Brazil Zone, eight from ties between South Zone and North Zone) advanced to the round of 16 to join the defending champion (Lanús).

First stage
The first legs were played on August 19–21, and the second legs were played on August 26–28, 2014.

|-
!colspan=6|South Zone

|-
!colspan=6|North Zone

|}

Match G1

Huachipato won 6–3 on aggregate.

Match G2

Universitario won 2–1 on aggregate.

Match G3

Deportivo Capiatá won 5–3 on aggregate.

Match G4

Cerro Porteño won 2–1 on aggregate.

Match G5

General Díaz won 4–3 on aggregate.

Match G6

Libertad won 3–1 on aggregate.

Match G7

River Plate won 4–0 on aggregate.

Match G8

Peñarol won 6–0 on aggregate.

Match G9

Caracas won 2–0 on aggregate.

Match G10

Barcelona won 3–0 on aggregate.

Match G11

Atlético Nacional won 2–1 on aggregate.

Match G12

Emelec won 3–2 on aggregate.

Match G13

Deportivo Cali won 3–0 on aggregate.

Match G14

Universidad César Vallejo won 4–3 on aggregate.

Match G15

Independiente del Valle won 2–1 on aggregate.

Match G16

Tied 2–2 on aggregate, Universidad Católica won on penalties.

Second stage
The first legs were played on August 27–28, September 3–4, 10–11, and 16–18, and the second legs were played on September 3–4, 16–18, and 23–25, 2014.

|}

Match O1

Vitória won 3–1 on aggregate.

Match O2

Deportivo Capiatá won 4–2 on aggregate.

Match O3

River Plate won 3–0 on aggregate.

Match O4

Huachipato won 2–1 on aggregate.

Match O5

Tied 2–2 on aggregate, Goiás won on away goals.

Match O6

Peñarol won 3–2 on aggregate.

Match O8

Universidad César Vallejo won 5–2 on aggregate.

Match O9

Bahia won 3–1 on aggregate.

Match O10

Cerro Porteño won 3–1 on aggregate.

Match O11

Estudiantes won 1–0 on aggregate.

Match O12

Emelec won 3–2 on aggregate.

Match O13

São Paulo won 3–2 on aggregate.

Match O14

Libertad won 2–1 on aggregate.

Match O15

Boca Juniors won 4–1 on aggregate.

Match O16

Tied 3–3 on aggregate, Atlético Nacional won on away goals.

References

External links
 
Copa Sudamericana, CONMEBOL.com 

1